Kehinde Amoo Owoeye (born 31 July 1995) is a Nigerian footballer who currently plays as a defensive midfielder for Binatlı YSK in the KTFF Süper Lig.

Career

Kastrioti Krujë
Kehinde returned to Kastrioti Krujë in July 2015 ahead of the 2015–16 Albanian First Division campaign on a one-year deal.

References

1995 births
Living people
Nigerian footballers
Kategoria Superiore players
Kategoria e Parë players
Nigerian expatriate footballers
Nigerian expatriate sportspeople in Albania
Expatriate footballers in Albania
KF Bylis Ballsh players
FK Tomori Berat players
KF Laçi players
KS Kastrioti players
Expatriate footballers in Northern Cyprus
BCC Lions F.C. players
Binatlı Yılmaz S.K. players
Association football midfielders